Danielle Collins was the defending champion, but chose not to participate as she was still competing at the Australian Open.

Bianca Andreescu won her first WTA 125K series title, defeating Jessica Pegula in the final, 0–6, 6–4, 6–2.

Seeds
All seeds received a bye into the second round.

Draw

Finals

Top half

Section 1

Section 2

Bottom half

Section 3

Section 4

Qualifying

Seeds

Qualifiers

Qualifying draw

First qualifier

Second qualifier

References
Main Draw
Qualifying Draw

2019 WTA 125K series
2019 Women's Singles